"Apparently" is a song by North Carolina rapper J. Cole, released on December 9, 2014 as the lead single from his third studio album, 2014 Forest Hills Drive. The song samples "La Morte Dell'ermina" by Filippo Trecca, and was produced by J. Cole. The song has since peaked at number 58 and 17 on the Billboard Hot 100 and Hot R&B/Hip-Hop Songs charts, respectively. The song was nominated for Best Rap Performance for the 2016 Grammys.

Music video
On December 10, 2014, the accompanying video for "Apparently" was released on Cole's Vevo channel. The video features several shots of Cole standing in front of various video projections.

Charts

Certifications

References

2014 singles
2014 songs
J. Cole songs
Songs written by J. Cole
Song recordings produced by J. Cole
Columbia Records singles